is a 1996 Japanese adult original video animation. It is the only animated film to be based on the manga by Go Nagai.

Cast 

  as Little Jubei
  as Yasohachi Yamagishi
  as Hige Godzilla
 Junpei Takiguchi as Marugoshi sensei

References

External links 

 Works  at the Dynamic Pro Official Site

1996 films
OVAs based on manga
1990s Japanese films